Mandy Burrekers (born 10 January 1988, Amsterdam) is a Dutch team handball goalkeeper. She last played for German handball club Borussia Dortmund Handball, and participated at the 2011 World Women's Handball Championship in Brazil.

References

External links

1988 births
Living people
Dutch female handball players
Sportspeople from Amsterdam
21st-century Dutch women